The following list includes all of the Canadian Register of Historic Places listings in Okanagan-Similkameen Regional District, British Columbia.

Okanagan-Similkameen Regional District
H